= UT football =

UT Football may refer to:

- Tennessee Volunteers football
- Texas Longhorns football
- Utah Utes football
- University of Tulsa Golden Hurricane football
